Matthew J. Tracy (born November 26, 1988) is an American former professional baseball pitcher and current coach who is the bullpen coach for the Cincinnati Reds. He played in Major League Baseball (MLB) for the New York Yankees. In 2020, Tracy joined the Toronto Blue Jays organization as a coach.

Playing career

New York Yankees
Tracy played college baseball at the University of Mississippi for the Ole Miss Rebels from 2008 to 2011. After his junior year, he was drafted by the Florida Marlins in the 43rd round of the 2010 Major League Baseball draft, but did not sign and returned to Ole Miss for his senior season.

Tracy was then drafted by the New York Yankees in the 24th round of the 2011 Major League Baseball draft. He signed with the Yankees and made his professional debut that season with the Staten Island Yankees. Tracy pitched 2012 with the Tampa Yankees of the Class A-Advanced Florida State League and also made one start with the Scranton/Wilkes-Barre Yankees of the Class AAA International League. He pitched 2013 with the Trenton Thunder of the Class AA Eastern League. Tracy started 2014 back with Trenton and was promoted to the RailRiders in July.

The Yankees promoted Tracy to the major leagues on April 11, 2015, and he pitched two innings against the Boston Red Sox, yielding three unearned runs. Tracy was designated for assignment the next day, and claimed off of waivers by the Marlins on April 18. The Marlins assigned Tracy to the New Orleans Zephyrs of the International League. He was then designated for assignment by the Marlins on April 21 and claimed by the Yankees the next day. The Yankees outrighted him off of the 40-man roster after he cleared waivers on June 4.

Miami Marlins
On June 19, 2016, the Miami Marlins and Tracy agreed on a Minor League deal. On November 7, 2016, Tracy elected free agency.

Minnesota Twins
On January 6, 2017, he signed a minor league contract with the Minnesota Twins. He elected free agency on November 6, 2017.

Toronto Blue Jays
On February 25, 2018, Tracy signed a minor league contract with the Toronto Blue Jays. He elected free agency on November 2, 2018.

Coaching
In January 2020, Tracy joined the Blue Jays organization as a pitching coach for the Rookie-level Gulf Coast League Blue Jays.

References

External links

Ole Miss Rebels bio

1988 births
Living people
Baseball players from St. Louis
Major League Baseball pitchers
New York Yankees players
Ole Miss Rebels baseball players
Staten Island Yankees players
Tampa Yankees players
Trenton Thunder players
Scranton/Wilkes-Barre RailRiders players
Jupiter Hammerheads players
Jacksonville Suns players
Bravos de Margarita players
American expatriate baseball players in Venezuela
Chattanooga Lookouts players
Rochester Red Wings players
Buffalo Bisons (minor league) players
Gulf Coast Twins players
Gulf Coast Blue Jays players